Kamonomiya Station is the name of multiple train stations in Japan.

 Kamonomiya Station (Kanagawa) (鴨宮駅) - in Kanagawa Prefecture
 Kamonomiya Station (Saitama) (加茂宮駅) - in Saitama Prefecture